Reactor Party was the first single released by the band Shitdisco from Glasgow, scotland. It was released on 23 October 2006 and reached #73 in the UK charts. The song is inspired by the gabba raves that reportedly take place in decommissioned nuclear reactors in the former Soviet Union.

Formats

12"
Reactor Party
Bolsheviks
Reactor Party (Luke Smith MPC-MIX)
I Know Kung Fu (James Ford edit)

CD Single
Reactor Party
Bolsheviks
Reactor Party (Luke Smith MPC-MIX)

7"
Reactor Party
I Know Kung Fu (Nightmoves Remix)

Video
The video was filmed in a disused railway tunnel in the west end of Glasgow and a boiler room in the Glasgow School of Art.  It was directed by Danny McConnel and Rik from Square Lips productions.

External links
Reactor Party video on YouTube
Official Website
Shitdisco Myspace

2006 singles
2006 songs
Fierce Panda Records singles